PhoneNET was an implementation of the AppleTalk networking physical layer created by Farallon Computing (now Netopia).

Instead of the shielded twisted pair wiring and three-pin Mini-DIN connectors employed by Apple's LocalTalk implementation, PhoneNET uses standard four-conductor telephone (Category 1) patch cords and RJ-11 modular connectors.

Like LocalTalk, the maximum speed for data transfer was 230 kbit/s unless accelerating drivers were used to override the operating system's drivers. Unlike LocalTalk, which only supported a daisy chain topology, PhoneNET was principally used in star topologies over structured cabling plants.

Functionality 

Unlike LocalTalk's four-wire grounded implementation, PhoneNET used a single twisted pair, or the outside two wires of a four-conductor flat cable.

As normal telephone equipment used the inside two wires, PhoneNET could share cabling with telephones, allowing both phone calls and networking over a single cable.

Superseded by 
Though PhoneNET transceivers are still available from third parties for use on legacy Macintosh networks, no current Apple computer or device have the RS-422 mini-DIN-8 serial ports that are required for LocalTalk networking.
Modern Apple devices use Ethernet or wireless networking.

External links 
PhoneNET User's Guide: Scribd - Internet Archive
Schematics
Photos

Local area networks
Physical layer protocols